A lament or lamentation is a passionate expression of grief, often in music, poetry, or song form. The grief is most often born of regret, or mourning. Laments can also be expressed in a verbal manner in which participants lament about something that they regret or someone that they have lost, and they are usually accompanied by wailing, moaning and/or crying. Laments constitute some of the oldest forms of writing, and examples exist across human cultures.

History

Many of the oldest and most lasting poems in human history have been laments. The Lament for Sumer and Ur dates back at least 4000 years to ancient Sumer, the world's first urban civilization. Laments are present in both the Iliad and the Odyssey, and laments continued to be sung in elegiacs accompanied by the aulos in classical and Hellenistic Greece. Elements of laments appear in Beowulf, in the Hindu Vedas, and in ancient Near Eastern religious texts. They are included in the Mesopotamian City Laments such as the Lament for Ur and the Jewish Tanakh, (which would later become the Christian Old Testament).

In many oral traditions, both early and modern, the lament has been a genre usually performed by women: Batya Weinbaum made a case for the spontaneous lament of women chanters in the creation of the oral tradition that resulted in the Iliad The material of lament, the "sound of trauma" is as much an element in the Book of Job as in the genre of pastoral elegy, such as Shelley's "Adonais" or Matthew Arnold's "Thyrsis".

The Book of Lamentations or Lamentations of Jeremiah figures in the Old Testament. The Lamentation of Christ (under many closely variant terms) is a common subject from the Life of Christ in art, showing Jesus' dead body being mourned after the Crucifixion. Jesus himself lamented over the prospective fall of Jerusalem as he and his disciples entered the city ahead of his passion.

A lament in the Book of Lamentations or in the Psalms, in particular in the Lament/Complaint Psalms of the Tanakh, may be looked at as "a cry of need in a context of crisis when Israel lacks the resources to fend for itself". Another way of looking at it is all the more basic: laments simply being "appeals for divine help in distress". These laments, too, often have a set format: an address to God, description of the suffering/anguish from which one seeks relief, a petition for help and deliverance, a curse towards one's enemies, an expression of the belief of ones innocence or a confession of the lack thereof, a vow corresponding to an expected divine response, and lastly, a song of thanksgiving. Examples of a general format of this, both in the individual and communal laments, can be seen in Psalm 3 and Psalm 44 respectively.

The Lament of Edward II, if it is actually written by Edward II of England, is the sole surviving composition of his.

A heroine's lament is a conventional fixture of baroque opera seria, accompanied usually by strings alone, in descending tetrachords. Because of their plangent cantabile melodic lines, evocatively free, non-strophic construction and adagio pace, operatic laments have remained vividly memorable soprano or mezzo-soprano arias even when separated from the emotional pathos of their operatic contexts. An early example is Ariadne's "Lasciatemi morire", which is the only survivor of Claudio Monteverdi's lost Arianna. Francesco Cavalli's operas extended the lamento formula, in numerous exemplars, of which Ciro's "Negatemi respiri" from Ciro is notable.

Other examples include Dido's Lament ("When I am laid in earth") (Henry Purcell, Dido and Aeneas), "Lascia ch'io pianga" (George Frideric Handel, Rinaldo), "Caro mio ben" (Tomaso or Giuseppe Giordani). The lament continued to represent a musico-dramatic high point. In the context of opera buffa, the Countess's lament, "Dove sono", comes as a surprise to the audience of Wolfgang Amadeus Mozart's The Marriage of Figaro, and in Gioachino Rossini's Barber of Seville, Rosina's plaintive words at her apparent abandonment are followed, not by the expected lament aria, but by a vivid orchestral interlude of storm music. The heroine's lament remained a fixture in romantic opera, and the Marschallin's monologue in act 1 of Der Rosenkavalier can be understood as a penetrating psychological lament.

In Modernity, discourses about Melancholia and Trauma take the functional place ritual laments hold in premodern societies. This entails a shift from a focus on community and convention to individuality and authenticity.

Scottish laments
The purely instrumental lament is a common form in piobaireachd music for the Scottish bagpipes. "MacCrimmon's Lament" dates to the Jacobite uprising of 1745. The tune is held to have been written by Donald Ban MacCrimmon, piper to the MacLeods of Dunvegan, who supported the Hanoverians. It is said that Donald Ban, who was killed at Moy in 1746, had an intimation that he would not return.

A well-known Gaelic lullaby is "Griogal Cridhe" ("Beloved Gregor"). It was composed in 1570 after the execution of Gregor MacGregor by the Campbells. The grief-stricken widow, Marion Campbell, describes what happened as she sings to her child.

"" ("Lament for the Children") is a pìobaireachd composed by Padruig Mór MacCrimmon in the early 1650s. It is generally held to be based on the loss of seven of MacCrimmon's eight sons within a year to smallpox, possibly brought to Skye by a Spanish trading vessel. Poet and writer Angus Peter Campbell, quoting poet Sorley MacLean, has called it "one of the great artistic glories of all Europe". Author Bridget MacKenzie, in Piping Traditions of Argyll, suggests that it refers to the slaughter of the MacLeod's fighting Cromwell's forces at the Battle of Worcester. It may have been inspired by both.

Other Scottish laments from outside of the piobaireachd tradition include "Lowlands Away", "MacPherson's Rant", and "Hector the Hero".

Musical form
There is a short, free musical form appearing in the Baroque and then again in the Romantic periods, called a lament.  It is typically a set of harmonic variations in homophonic texture, wherein the bass descends through a tetrachord, usually one suggesting a minor mode.

See also
 Ballad
 Dirge
 Death poem
 Death wail
 Doina
 Elegy
Endecha – Galician lament, subgenre of the planto
 Keening
 Kinah (plural: kinnot) – Kinnot are traditional Hebrew poems recited on Tisha B'Av lamenting the destruction of the First and Second Temples and other historical catastrophes. (The term "kinah" also appears in the Bible, referring to lamentation).
 Kommós
 Lament bass
 Mawwal, Middle Eastern variant
 Threnody
 King Crimson's track "Prince Rupert's Lament" on 1970 album Lizard, an instrumental lament played with electric guitar as lead instrument, and the song "Lament" on 1974 album Starless and Bible Black
 Frederik Magle track "Lament" on the 2010 album Like a Flame

Notes

Further reading
H. Munro Chadwick, Nora Kershaw Chadwick, The Growth of Literature (Cambridge: Cambridge University Press, 1932–40), e.g. vol. 2 p. 229.
Richard Church, The Lamendation of Military Campaigns. PDQ: Steve Ruling, 2000.
Andrew Dalby, Rediscovering Homer (New York: Norton, 2006. ) pp. 141–143.
Gail Holst-Warhaft, Dangerous Voices: Women's Laments and Greek Literature. London: Routledge, 1992. .
Nancy C. Lee, Lyrics of Lament: From Tragedy to Transformation. Minneapolis: Fortress, 2010.
 Marcello Sorce Keller, "Expressing, Communicating, Sharing and Representing Grief and Sorrow with Organised Sound (Musings in Eight Short Segments)", in Stephen Wild, Di Roy, Aaron Corn and Ruth Lee Martin (eds), One Common Thread – The Musical World of Lament – Thematic Issue of Humanities Research. Canberra, ANU University Press, vol. XIX, no. 3. 2013, 3–14
Claus Westermann, Praise and Lament in the Psalms. Westminster: John Knox Press, 1981. .

External links

Greek laments (Thrênoi, Moirológia)

Andrea Fishman, "Thrênoi to Moirológia: Female Voices of Solitude, Resistance, and Solidarity" Oral Tradition, 23/2 (2008): 267–295
Roderick Beaton, Folk Poetry of Modern Greece, Cambridge University Press, 2004
Greek lament song (Mοιρολόϊ – Moiroloi) from Mani, performed in a funeral
Greek lament song (Mοιρολόϊ – Moiroloi) from Epirus, instrumental

Social philosophy
Traditions
Genres of poetry
Death customs
Melancholia
Oral communication
Behavior
Grief
Funeral orations
Laments
Death music